Dibutyl tartrate is a di-ester of tartaric acid and butanol. It has been used as a chiral oil to separate enantiomers in chromatography. Another use is in farinographs. Yet another use is as a plasticizer. The material is classed as "green" as it is made from natural products, and is biodegradable.

Properties
The dielectric constant of dibutyl tartrate is 9.4

References

Tartrate esters
Butyl compounds